The 1991–92 National Soccer League season, was the 16th season of the National Soccer League in Australia.

Overview
The 1991/92 National Soccer League season saw fourteen teams compete with Adelaide City winning the championship after defeating Melbourne Croatia in the grand final on a penalty shootout 4-2 after the scores were locked at 0-0 after full-time and extra time at Olympic Park, Melbourne in front of 15,463 fans. Melbourne Croatia were named premiers after finishing the home-and-away season on top of the table one point clear ahead of Sydney Olympic.

This was the only season socceroos goalkeeper Mark Bosnich, strikers Paul Agostino and John Aloisi would compete in the National Soccer League. Bosnich, signed from Manchester United, would make five appearances for his junior club Sydney Croatia before heading back to England to play for Aston Villa.Agostino, at age sixteen, would make seventeen appearances and score six goals with West Adelaide before heading to Switzerland to play for BSC Young Boys and John Aloisi would make one appearance for Adelaide City before heading to Standard Liège in Belgium. Other significant signings included former Hong Kong international striker Tim Bredbury signing with Sydney Olympic who would finish the season joint top goal scorer with fifteen goals, and Albanian Fadil Muriqi signing with Sydney Croatia, becoming the first ever Albanian to play in the National Soccer League. 
 
This would be the final season in the National Soccer League for A.P.I.A. Leichhardt as they fell into financial troubles and went down to the NSW Super League in 1993.

Regular season

League table

Finals series

Individual awards
Player of the Year: Josip Biskic (Melbourne Croatia)
U-21 Player of the Year: Kevin Muscat (Heidelberg United)
Top Scorer(s): Tim Bredbury (Sydney Olympic) and Kimon Taliadoros (South Melbourne) – 15 goals
Coach of the Year: David Ratcliffe (Wollongong City)

References

External links
Australia - List of final tables (RSSSF)
All scores and match details of 1991/92 NSL season (ozfootball.net)
1991/92 final season table including notes (ozfootball.net)

National Soccer League (Australia) seasons
1991 in Australian soccer
1992 in Australian soccer
Aus
Aus